Lisa F. Jackson (born 1950) is an American documentary filmmaker, known most recently for her films, The Greatest Silence: Rape in the Congo (2007) and Sex Crimes Unit (2011), which aired on HBO in 2008 and 2011. Her work has earned awards including two Emmy awards and a Jury Prize from the Sundance Film Festival.  She has screened her work and lectured at the Columbia University School of Journalism, Brandeis, Purdue, NYU, Yale, Notre Dame and Harvard University and was a visiting professor of documentary film at the School of Visual Arts in Manhattan.

Early life and career
Lisa (Elisabeth) Finch Jackson was born in San Francisco, California in 1950, the daughter of Nancy Abrams and Morton B. Jackson.  When she was young, both her father and stepfather, Donald Carmichael, were in the CIA, and as a result she moved often, living in Bangkok, Thailand and in Bogota, Colombia before settling in Washington, DC in 1963.

Jackson studied filmmaking at MIT with famed documentarian Richard Leacock. In 1972 she moved back to Washington DC, working first as a location sound recordist, then as a film and videotape editor on such films as Reflections on a Revolution for Bill Moyers' Journal, The Unquiet Death of Julius and Ethel Rosenberg for PBS and, working with filmmaker Charles Guggenheim, TV campaign spots for Senators Frank Church, Fritz Hollings and Ted Kennedy.

She has directed and/or edited dozens of films for PBS, including Voices and Visions: Emily Dickinson, Jackson Pollock: Portrait, Through Madness (a 1993 NYC Emmy winner), The Creative Spirit, Storytellers, The Sixth Van Cliburn International Piano Competition, Bill Moyers' Journal, The Mind, and segments for Sesame Street and Live from Lincoln Center.

Jackson's credits as a producer/director include Meeting with a Killer: One Family’s Journey (2001, Court TV; 2001 Emmy Award nominee), Life Afterlife (1999, HBO), The Secret Life of Barbie (1998, ABC; 1999 Emmy Award winner), Why Am I Gay? (1993) and Addicted (1997)  for HBO's America Undercover series, Smart Sex (1994) and No Money, Mo' Problems (1998) for the MTV series True Life, The Other Epidemic (1993, ABC), Firefighters (1997,  The Learning Channel), A Passion to Play (1997, ABC Sports), five episodes of the Hallmark Channel's acclaimed Adoption series (2001–2003), including stories shot in Siberia and Guatemala; and two seasons of the hit series Psychic Detectives (2002–2005, Court TV).  Jackson has also produced public service announcements for the US Justice Department's Office for Victims of Crime and a short film to support UN Women's work in the Cote d'Ivoire and she has spent the last four years shooting Tres Mujeres (“Three Women”), a documentary about a group of displaced women living in the slums of Bogotá, Colombia. It is currently in post-production.

The Greatest Silence
For her documentary The Greatest Silence: Rape in the Congo, Jackson filmed in the war zones of the Democratic Republic of the Congo. The Greatest Silence won a Special Jury Prize for Documentaries at the 2008 Sundance Film Festival, earned two Emmy nominations and was seen on HBO in 2009. The film has received notices and articles in The New York Times, Human Rights Quarterly, and Ms.. The feature-length film provides an intimate look into the horror - and grace - of the lives of women and girls who have survived sexual violence in this war-torn region.

Sex Crimes Unit
Jackson’s 2011 documentary, Sex Crimes Unit, offers a look inside the New York District Attorney’s office at the preeminent unit in the U.S. dedicated to the prosecution of rape and sexual assault.  The film follows members of the unit through their investigations, including the case of a prostitute who is a victim of rape and a woman whose case was literally almost thrown away. It aired on HBO in 2011 to positive reviews.

It Happened Here
2014 saw the release of Jackson's documentary about sexual assault on campus, It Happened Here, which debuted on the Pivot network on January 21. Beginning in February 2014, the film was screened on several college campuses as part of the It's On Us campaign launched in 2013 by President Barack Obama and the White House Council on Women and Girls to raise awareness and fight against sexual assault on college campuses for both men and women. The film "explores sexual assault on campuses through the personal testimonials of five survivors who transform their experiences into a springboard for change. It Happened Here includes the personal portraits of five students at three schools along with testimonials from college administrators, educators, mental health experts and legal scholars".

Critical reception
Tom Shales of the Washington Post has praised Lisa F. Jackson’s documentaries as “superb” and “outstanding”. John O’Connor commented in the New York Times that “producer/director Lisa F. Jackson is remarkably adept in getting her subjects to speak frankly and thoughtfully.” The Christian Science Monitor noted that she takes on difficult subjects “with intelligence and courage.”
  
John Anderson of Variety wrote, “Helmer Lisa F. Jackson's Sex Crimes Unit is the real thing, a gritty, emotional, up-close-and-procedural look at the actual New York district attorneys dedicated to prosecuting rape and sexual assault... Sex Crimes Unit has drama, suspense, terrific personalities and a great deal of heart.  The attorneys are portrayed as basic, funny, human people who just happen to be devoted to a job not many people could do, or would want to do.”

Michael Cieply at NYTimes.com wrote that ‘Sex Crimes Unit’ “is an overall primer on the crime of rape and the extreme difficulty involved with its prosecution... takes a close look at a mostly female group of prosecutors and assistants who clearly take visceral joy in their victories.”

Awards and honors
       2012 Muse Award from New York Women in Film & Television
	Emmy nominations for Writing/Outstanding Special, 2009
	iWitness Award, Jewish World Watch, 2009
	Sundance Jury Prize/Documentary, 2008
	Emmy Award for Outstanding Informational Special, 1999
	New York City Emmy for Outstanding Informational Special, 1993 (for Through Madness)
	Woman of Courage Award, UCSF, 2009
	Emmy nomination for Outstanding Informational Special, 2001
	Three CINE Golden Eagles, 1980, 1999, 2004
	Best Documentary Awards from the Rome Independent Film Festival, 2008 and International Black DocuFest, 2009
	Audience Choice Awards from the London HRWFF (2008), One World Slovakia (2008), Vancouver (2008), Breckenridge (2000) and Cinequest (2000) film festivals
	Gracie Award from AWRT, 2009
	Four Houston International Film Festival Gold Awards
	Silver Chris Award from the Columbus International Film Festival, 2000
	Two Gold Clarion Awards from Women in Communications, 1995
	Movies That Matter Award from Amnesty International, 2008
	Special Jury Award, Hemisfilm International Film Festival
	Margaret Sanger “Maggie” Award, PPFA, Best Documentary of the Year, 1995
	2 Gold “Cindy” Awards, Information Film Producers of America

References

External links
 Lisa F. Jackson page at IMDB
 https://www.jacksonfilms.com

American documentary filmmakers
Massachusetts Institute of Technology alumni
1950 births
Living people